The Elisyces were a tribe that occupied the region of Narbonne and northern Roussillon in ancient times. According to various ancient sources, they could be of Iberian-Ligurian origin.

The Elisyces seem to have been in contact with the peoples of the Mediterranean traders (Phoenicians, Greek, Etruscans) which they provided agricultural products and mineral resources from their territories or outlying areas and were routed to their commercial spaces (Pech Maho).

References

External links 
 Pech Maho aux VIe-Ve s. av. J.-C. Une place d'échange en territoire élisyque, Eric Gailledrat, Pierre Rouillard, Revue archéologique de Narbonnaise no 35, pàgs. 401-410, 2003. Suppléments ISSN 0153-9124. Association de la revue archéologique de Narbonnaise, Montpellier
 Museu d'arqueologia de Catalunya. La ruta dels ibers
Iberians